Qesmat Ahmadi (Dari: قسمت احمدی; born 13 August 1996), sometimes referred to as Qismat Ahmadi, is an Afghan international footballer who plays as a midfielder for Afghan Premier League side Mawjhai Amu F.C.

International career
Ahmadi was first called up to the senior national squad in 2015 for the 2015 SAFF Championship, but failed to make an appearance. He would have to wait until late 2016 to make his debut, which came in a 1–1 friendly draw with Malaysia.

Career statistics

International

References

External links
 

1996 births
Living people
Afghan men's footballers
Afghanistan international footballers
Association football midfielders